Southampton Airport Parkway railway station is on the South West Main Line located in the south of Eastleigh in Hampshire, England,  down the line from . It is adjacent to Southampton Airport.

The station has two platforms. The other line runs southbound towards Southampton, Bournemouth, Portsmouth and Weymouth.

History
The station opened with different structures as the Atlantic Park Hostel Halt in 1929, built by the Southern Railway and closed before the 1950s. In 1966, many of the present parts were built and services resumed by British Rail as Southampton Airport railway station (1966). The station was later renamed Southampton Parkway railway station (1986) and Southampton Airport Parkway railway station (1994).

Facilities 
The station was upgraded in 2010 with a new footbridge with lifts to improve accessibility for disabled people costing £2 million as part of a wider £7 million investment in the airport. Additionally, lobbying was done to keep the station as a stop on all major routes in the service pattern, which was successful.

Services

3 ½ tph to  via Southampton Central, of which
1 tph continue to  via  (South Western Railway)
1 tph continues to Poole only (South Western Railway)
1 tph to  via  (South Western Railway)
1 tph to  via Southampton Central and Romsey (South Western Railway)
1 tp2h to  via  &   (CrossCountry)
1 tpd to  via Southampton Central (GWR)

References

External links 

Railway stations in Hampshire
DfT Category C1 stations
Former Southern Railway (UK) stations
Railway stations in Great Britain opened in 1929
Railway stations closed in the 20th century
Railway stations in Great Britain opened in 1966
Railway stations served by CrossCountry
Railway stations served by South Western Railway
Airport railway stations in the United Kingdom
Railway stations served by Govia Thameslink Railway
Railway stations served by Great Western Railway